Bishop Historic District is a historical residential district located in the town of Bishop, Oconee Couny, Georgia, United States.

The district was added to the National Register of Historic Places in 1996 due to its number of historic resources within the town of Bishop's limits. At private, public-local and public-federal levels, the town has 63 contributing buildings, one contributing site and one contributing structure.

The area registered as having historical significance is roughly along Price Mill Road, Old Bishop Road and U.S. Route 441 within the Bishop town limits.

See also
National Register of Historic Places listings in Oconee County, Georgia

References

External links
Asset Detail - NPS.gov

Queen Anne architecture in Georgia (U.S. state)
Colonial Revival architecture in Georgia (U.S. state)
Neoclassical architecture in Georgia (U.S. state)
Historic districts on the National Register of Historic Places in Georgia (U.S. state)
National Register of Historic Places in Oconee County, Georgia